Buddapalli is a small village near Markapur in the Prakasam district, Andhra Pradesh, India.

References 

Villages in Prakasam district